Andigena, the mountain toucans, is a genus of birds in the family Ramphastidae. They are found in humid highland forests in the Andes of South America, ranging from Bolivia to Venezuela. These medium-sized toucans all have olive-brown upperparts, a black crown, yellow rump, blue-grey underparts and a red vent.

Taxonomy and systematics

Extant species

Former species
Some authorities, either presently or formerly, recognize additional species or subspecies as species belonging to the genus Andigena including:
 Saffron toucanet (as Andigena bailloni)

References

 Restall, R. L., C. Rodner, & M. Lentino. (2006). Birds of Northern South America. Christopher Helm, London.  (vol. 1).  (vol. 2).
 Schulenberg, T., D. Stotz, D. Lane, J. O' Neill, & T. Parker III. 2007. Birds of Peru. Christopher Helm, London. 

 
Taxonomy articles created by Polbot
Taxa named by John Gould